The Rocca Abbaziale (also called the Rocca dei Borgia) is an abbey, designed as a castle, in Subiaco, Lazio, Italy.

History

The abbey, built in the late 11th century, was designed as a castle to establish control over the surrounding town. It was constructed with fortifications, prison cells, a watchtower, apartments and a chapel dedicated to St. Thomas. The castle was damaged by an earthquake in 1349 and was abandoned. It was looted and further damaged by townsfolk and was left uninhabited for many years thereafter.

In 1476, the castle was restored by cardinal Rodrigo Borgia who expanded the fortifications to defend the oldest part of the building. According to some historians, Cesare Borgia and Lucrezia Borgia were both born in the castle to Rodrigo's mistress Vannozza dei Cattanei. The castle was eventually purchased by the Colonna family.

In 1778, by order of Pope Pius VI, the architect Pietro Camporese further restored the castle, removing medieval elements like the prison cells and fortifications, and installing more modern features like a large clock. Subsequent popes used the castle as accommodation away from Rome.

Features

The complex includes three distinct buildings, each designed in a different architectural style. Many of the original frescoes remain intact.

Gallery

See also
List of castles in Italy

References

Castles in Lazio